Abyssoberyx is a genus in the pricklefish family containing the single species Abyssoberyx levisquamosus, which is found in the northeast Atlantic Ocean at depths of from . This species grows to a length of  SL.

References
 

Stephanoberycidae
Monotypic ray-finned fish genera
Taxa named by Nigel Merrett